Gulbransson is a surname. Notable people with the surname include:

Grete Gulbransson (1882–1934), Austrian writer and poet
Olaf Andreas Gulbransson (1916–1961), German architect of Norwegian descent
Olaf Gulbransson (1873–1958), Norwegian artist, painter, and designer

See also
Gulbranson